Siblings is a BBC Three sitcom starring Charlotte Ritchie and Tom Stourton in the lead roles. Written by Keith Akushie, the show piloted on 7 August 2014. A second series was commissioned by the BBC on 10 September 2014 before the first series had finished airing. The second series began broadcasting on 4 January 2016.

The last episode of the second series aired on 8 February 2016. Following BBC Three's move into an online based channel, on 18 July 2016, it was announced that no third series would be made.

Plot
A sitcom following the lives of Hannah French and her younger brother Dan. They are lazy, selfish, carefree twentysomethings who share a flat in London. They look to lead easy, fun lives and frequently cause chaos.

Production

Filming
The show was filmed in and around West London, England.

Cast
 Charlotte Ritchie as Hannah. She is proud of her job at an insurance company's office, but is too lazy to do it properly. Wherever she can she tries to get herself time off or something else to make it easier. When she is not at work or resolving Dan's mess, she tries to find some way to party.
 Tom Stourton as Dan, Hannah's eccentric, naive, dim-witted brother. He has no qualifications and recently served a short prison sentence for a non-violent crime. He tries to be charming and is easily impressed. He often becomes bored and is often led by Hannah.

Episodes

Series overview

Series 1 (2014)

Series 2 (2016)

International broadcast
 — The programme premiered on ABC2 on 13 January 2015.

References

External links

2014 British television series debuts
2016 British television series endings
2010s British sitcoms
BBC high definition shows
BBC television sitcoms
Casual sex in television
English-language television shows
Television series about dysfunctional families
Television series about siblings
Television series by Banijay
Television shows set in London